Thecideida is an order of cryptic articulate brachiopods characterized by their small size and habit of cementing their ventral valves to hard substrates such as shells, rocks and carbonate hardgrounds. Thecideides first appear in the Triassic (Jaecks and Carlson, 2001) and are common today (Lüter, 2005; Lüter et al., 2007).

Taxonomy
Order Thecideida
Superfamily Thecideoidea Gray, 1840
Superfamily Thecospiroidea Bittner, 1890

References
 Paleobiology Database on thecideides

Brachiopod orders
Rhynchonellata